Route nationale 32 (RN 32) is a secondary highway in Madagascar from Antsohihy to Mandritsara, continuing to Andilamena. It crosses the regions of Alaotra-Mangoro and Sofia Region.

Selected locations on route
(north to south)
Antsohihy  (junction with RN 6)
Befandriana-Avaratra 
 river crossing
Binara 
Mandritsara 
Marotandrano 
Ambohibary 
Sahavoay 
Marofano 
Ambodivelatra 
Antranoambo 
Antanimenabaka 
Andilamena (continues as RN 3a)

See also
List of roads in Madagascar
Transport in Madagascar

References

Roads in Alaotra-Mangoro
Roads in Sofia Region
Roads in Madagascar